Giannino Castiglioni (4 May 1884 – 27 August 1971) was an Italian sculptor and medallist. He worked mostly in monumental and funerary sculpture; his style was representational, and far from the modernist and avant-garde trends of the early twentieth century.

Life 

Giannino Castiglioni was born on 4 May 1884 in Milan, the son of Giacomo Castiglioni and Piera Bergamaschi. His father was director of the Stefano Johnson mint in that city.

Castiglioni studied sculpture under Enrico Butti at the Accademia di Belle Arti di Brera in Milan. He first exhibited at the Milan International Exhibition in 1906, where he showed medals, a plaster statue and a painting. Castiglioni first opened a large studio on the Corso di Porta Nuova, and in 1927 he opened a second studio at his house in Lierna, on Lake Como. 

He married Livia Bolla, with whom he had four children: Livio (b. 1911), Pier Giacomo (b. 1913) and Achille (b. 1918). A daughter named Piera died in her infancy and is memorialised with a funerary sculpture by her father.

He died in Lierna on 27 August 1971.

Work 

From 1922 until 1928 Castiglioni worked on the plaster casts for friezes and monumental sculptures for the Palacio Legislativo of Montevideo, Uruguay; these were shipped to Uruguay, and the bronze or marble sculptures were made there. In 1941 he made the tomb of Pope Pius XI in the Vatican Grottoes.

Reception 

Castiglioni won the competition for the prize medal at the Milan International Exhibition in 1906. In 1922 he won the international competition to provide sculptures for the Palacio Legislativo of Montevideo. He left more than three hundred of his preparatory plaster casts to the comune of Lierna; a museum is to house them is under construction.

References

1884 births
1971 deaths
Artists from Milan
People from Lierna
20th-century Italian sculptors
20th-century Italian male artists
Italian male sculptors
20th-century Italian painters
Italian male painters
Art Nouveau medallists
Italian medallists
Brera Academy alumni